McAtamney is a surname. Notable people with the surname include:

 Frank McAtamney (1934–1998), New Zealand rugby union player
 Mairéad McAtamney (born 1944), Irish camogie player